Charles Lee (born November 19, 1977) is a former American football wide receiver in the National Football League. He has played for the Green Bay Packers, the Tampa Bay Buccaneers and the Arizona Cardinals. He was drafted in the seventh round of the 2000 NFL Draft. Lee was a member of the Tampa Bay Buccaneers' 2003 Super Bowl winning team. Already on probation for cocaine possession, he was arrested on December 5, 2007, for robbing two students near the University of Central Florida, the college where he formerly starred. He was sentenced to five years in prison, and planned to work on a prison ministry when released. Lee is a member of Kappa Alpha Psi fraternity.

References

1977 births
Living people
Homestead High School (Homestead, Florida) alumni
American football wide receivers
UCF Knights football players
Green Bay Packers players
Tampa Bay Buccaneers players
Arizona Cardinals players
Players of American football from Miami
Orlando Predators players